Andreï Svetchine, also known as André Svétchine, (1912–1996) was a Russian Empire-born French architect.

Svetchine was born in Saint Petersburg and died in Nice.

Works
 Villa of Marc Chagall in Saint-Jean-Cap-Ferrat (1949)
 Mill in Mougins for Raymonde Zehnaker (1951–1952)
 Château de La Colle Noire in Montauroux for Christian Dior (1955–1957)
 Fernand Léger Museum in Biot (1957–1960)
 Villa of Marc Chagall in Saint-Paul-de-Vence (1964–1966)
 Villa of brewer Heineken in Cap d'Antibes (1965–1966)

Restorations 
 Colombe d'Or in Saint-Paul-de-Vence (1949–1950)
 Orthodox Cathedral in Nice

References

1912 births
1996 deaths
Emigrants from the Russian Empire to France
Architects from Saint Petersburg
20th-century French architects